Josef Fuchs (born 13 March 1935) is a former Austrian Paralympic athlete. He represented Austria at the 1988 Summer Paralympics held in Seoul, South Korea and he won the bronze medal in the men's club throw C4 event. He also competed in the men's discus throw C4 event.

References

External links 
 

Living people
1935 births
Place of birth missing (living people)
Paralympic athletes of Austria
Athletes (track and field) at the 1988 Summer Paralympics
Paralympic bronze medalists for Austria
Medalists at the 1988 Summer Paralympics
Paralympic medalists in athletics (track and field)
Austrian club throwers
20th-century Austrian people